Danny Weidleris an Australian sports reporter He regularly appears on camera for the Nine Network delivering rugby league stories and does pieces for Nine's Footy Show (rugby league football). He contributes a weekly column for Sydney's Sun-Herald newspaper. 

In 2006, Weidler won a Walkley Award in Sport News Reporting for a piece on National Nine News entitled, "Russell's Rabbits".

References

Australian television journalists
Walkley Award winners
Australian television presenters
Living people
Australian people of German descent
Australian rugby league journalists
People educated at Sydney Boys High School
1966 births